Addo may refer to:

Addo (surname)
Addo Elephant National Park in Eastern Cape province, South Africa
Addo, Eastern Cape, village in Eastern Cape province, South Africa
AB Addo, Swedish former manufacturer of office machines
Edo language, also known as "Addo"

Given name
 Addo Bonetti (1926–2021), American politician
 Addo Kazianka (born 1936), Italian racing cyclist
 Addo Ndala (born 1973), Congolese hurdler